Cyril George Gove (10 January 1890 – 28 August 1973) was an Australian rules footballer who played with Essendon in the Victorian Football League (VFL).

Family
The son of Julius Gove (1854–1922), and Catherine Gove (1860–1923), née Blyth, Cyril George Gove was born on 10 January 1890. He married Olga Macaw (1907–1984) on 27 October 1932.

Football
Gove, from St Thomas' Grammar School, Essendon, played his early football for the Collegians. A wiry wingman, he played 16 games in the 1914 VFL season and was chosen to represent the VFL in the Sydney Carnival.

Amateur jockey
April, 1914
In April 1914, Gove rode five winners at the Southern Riverina Turf Club Picnic Meeting in Deniliquin.
29 May 1915
At 2:00PM on Saturday 29 May 1915, Gove rode the racehorse Menthe into third place in the Springbank Corinthian Handicap, a race for amateur riders, at Moonee Valley Racecourse. Immediately the race was over, he caught a fast cab down Mount Alexander Road, Melbourne to the East Melbourne Cricket Ground, and by 3:00PM he was playing for Essendon (and was one of its best players) in its round 6 match against South Melbourne.

Death
He died in Deniliquin, New South Wales on 28 August 1973, aged 83.

See also
 1914 Sydney Carnival

Footnotes

References
 Maplestone, M., Flying Higher: History of the Essendon Football Club 1872–1996, Essendon Football Club, (Melbourne), 1996. 
 Ross, J. (ed), 100 Years of Australian Football 1897–1996: The Complete Story of the AFL, All the Big Stories, All the Great Pictures, All the Champions, Every AFL Season Reported, Viking, (Ringwood), 1996.

External links

Cyril's historic 'triathlon': A jockey, footballer and boxer all in one day

1890 births
1973 deaths
People educated at Penleigh and Essendon Grammar School
Australian rules footballers from Melbourne
Collegians Football Club players
Essendon Football Club players
Australian jockeys
People from St Kilda, Victoria